The Annunciation Greek Orthodox Cathedral of New England is a historic Greek Orthodox Church in Boston, Massachusetts.

The Classical Revival church was designed by Hachadoor Demoorjian and built in 1923; design work of its interior included consultation with architect Ralph Adams Cram. It was added to the National Register of Historic Places as Greek Orthodox Cathedral of New England in 1988.

The Cathedral is the seat of the Greek Orthodox Metropolis of Boston, and served as the headquarters of the Greek Orthodox Metropolis of Boston until c. 1973, when its Residence was moved to 162 Goddard Avenue, Brookline, Massachusetts. The Annunciation Greek Orthodox Cathedral of New England remains at 514 Parker Street, Boston Massachusetts and remains the Mother Church of the Metropolis of Boston.

See also
National Register of Historic Places listings in southern Boston, Massachusetts

References

External links

Greek Orthodox Metropolis of Boston web Site

Churches in Boston
Greek-American culture in Massachusetts
Greek Orthodox cathedrals in the United States
Churches completed in 1923
20th-century Eastern Orthodox church buildings
Eastern Orthodox churches in Massachusetts
Churches on the National Register of Historic Places in Massachusetts
Fenway–Kenmore
National Register of Historic Places in Boston
Church buildings with domes